Herbert Davis was an academic.

Herbert Davis may also refer to:

 Herbert James Davis (1890–1950), veterinary surgeon and political figure in Ontario
 Herbert Nathaniel Davis (1867–1900), Australian architect
 Herbert Nelson Davis (1899–1963) organist, choirmaster and conductor
 Herbert Davis (cinematographer), on Grey's Anatomy
 Herb Davis, Canadian political candidate, see Conservative Party of Canada candidates, 2008 Canadian federal election
 Herb Davis, host of Land and Sea

See also
Bert Davis (disambiguation)
Herbert Davies (1818–1885), English physician